

Complete writings of Jane Roberts 

Books by Publication Date
 (1963) The Rebellers. Publisher: Ace Books, Inc. (Published as a Dual Mass Market Paperback Book with Listen! The Stars! by John Brunner) ISBN: None
(1966).  How To Develop Your ESP Power.  Publisher:  Federick Fell.  (Later retitled and reprinted as The Coming of Seth.)  .
 (1970). The Seth Material. Reprinted, 2001 by New Awareness Network.   . (A SETH BOOK) NB: The Seth Material is a summary and discussion of The Early Sessions material
 (1972).  Seth Speaks: The Eternal Validity of the Soul. Reprinted 1994 by Amber-Allen Publishing.  . (A SETH BOOK)
 (1974). The Nature of Personal Reality.  Prentice-Hall.  Reprinted 1994, Amber-Allen Publishing. . (A SETH BOOK)
 (1975).  Adventures in Consciousness:  An Introduction to Aspect Psychology.  Prentice-Hall.  .
 (1975).  Dialogues of the Soul and Mortal Self in Time.  Prentice-Hall.  .  Poetry.
 (1976).  Psychic Politics:  An Aspect Psychology Book.  Prentice-Hall.  .
 (1977). The "Unknown" Reality Vol. 1. Prentice-Hall.  Reprinted 1997, Amber-Allen Publishing.  . (A SETH BOOK)
 (1979). The "Unknown" Reality Vol. 2. Prentice-Hall.  Reprinted 1997, Amber-Allen Publishing.   . (A SETH BOOK)
 (1977).  The World View of Paul Cézanne:  A Psychic Interpretation.  Prentice-Hall.  .
 (1978).  The Afterdeath Journal of An American Philosopher:  The World View of William James.  Prentice-Hall.  .
 (1979).  Emir's Education in the Proper Use of Magical Powers.  Prentice-Hall.  .  Children's literature.
 (1979). The Nature of the Psyche: Its Human Expression.  Prentice-Hall. Reprinted 1996, Amber-Allen Publishing.  . (A SETH BOOK)
 (1981). The Individual and the Nature of Mass Events.  Prentice-Hall, .  Reprinted 1994, Amber-Allen Publishing, . (A SETH BOOK)
 (1995). The Oversoul Seven Trilogy.  Amber-Allen Publishing.  .  Edition: Paperback; May 1, 1995 (originally published as three separate books: The Education of Oversoul 7 (1973); The Further Education of Oversoul Seven (1979); Oversoul Seven and the Museum of Time (1984).
 (1981). The God of Jane: A Psychic Manifesto.  Prentice-Hall.  .  Reprinted 2000, Moment Point Press.  .
 (1982).  If We Live Again, Or, Public Magic and Private Love.  Prentice-Hall.  .  Poetry.
 (1986). Dreams, Evolution and Value Fulfillment. (A SETH BOOK)
 (1986).  Seth, Dreams and Projections of Consciousness.  Stillpoint Publishing.
 (1993).  A Seth Reader.  Vernal Equinox Press.  Compendium edited by Richard Roberts.  .
 (1995).  The Magical Approach : Seth Speaks About the Art of Creative Living.  Amber-Allen Publishing.  . (A SETH BOOK)
 (1997).  The Way Toward Health.  Robert F. Butts (Foreword), Amber-Allen Publishing.  . (A SETH BOOK)
 (2006).  The World View of Rembrandt.  New Awareness Network.  .
 (1997 and after).  The Early Sessions (Sessions 1 through 510 of the Seth Material).  New Awareness Network.  Edited by Robert Butts.  Nine volumes.  . (A SETH BOOK)
 (2003).  The Personal Sessions.  New Awareness Network.  Deleted session material.  Seven volumes.  . (A SETH BOOK)
 (2008) The Early Class Sessions.  New Awareness Network.  Four volumes. (A SETH BOOK)

Seth Books Only (by date channeled)
 (Channeled 1963-1970) (Published 1997 and after).  The Early Sessions (Sessions 1 through 510 of the Seth Material).  New Awareness Network.  Edited by Robert Butts.  Nine volumes.  . (A SETH BOOK)
 (Channeled 1965-1984) (Published 2003).  The Personal Sessions.  New Awareness Network.  Deleted session material.  Seven volumes.  . (A SETH BOOK)
 (Channeled 1967-1972) (Published 2008) The Early Class Sessions.  New Awareness Network.  Four volumes. (A SETH BOOK)
 (Channeled 1963-1970) (Published 1970). The Seth Material. Reprinted, 2001 by New Awareness Network.   . (A SETH BOOK) NB: The Seth Material is a summary and discussion of The Early Sessions material
 (Channeled 1970-1971) (Published 1972).  Seth Speaks: The Eternal Validity of the Soul. Reprinted 1994 by Amber-Allen Publishing.  . (A SETH BOOK)
 (Channeled 1972-1973) (Published 1974). The Nature of Personal Reality.  Prentice-Hall.  Reprinted 1994, Amber-Allen Publishing. . (A SETH BOOK)
 (Channeled 1974) (Published 1977). The "Unknown" Reality Vol. 1. Prentice-Hall.  Reprinted 1997, Amber-Allen Publishing.  . (A SETH BOOK)
 (Channeled 1974-1975) (Published 1979). The "Unknown" Reality Vol. 2. Prentice-Hall.  Reprinted 1997, Amber-Allen Publishing.   . (A SETH BOOK)
 (Channeled 1975-1977) (Published 1979). The Nature of the Psyche: Its Human Expression.  Prentice-Hall. Reprinted 1996, Amber-Allen Publishing.  . (A SETH BOOK)
 (Channeled 1977-1979) (Published 1981). The Individual and the Nature of Mass Events.  Prentice-Hall, .  Reprinted 1994, Amber-Allen Publishing, . (A SETH BOOK)
 (Channeled 1980) (Published 1995).  The Magical Approach : Seth Speaks About the Art of Creative Living.  Amber-Allen Publishing.  . (A SETH BOOK)
 (Channeled 1982) (Published 1986). Dreams, Evolution and Value Fulfillment. (A SETH BOOK)
 (Channeled 1984) (Published 1997).  The Way Toward Health.  Robert F. Butts (Foreword), Amber-Allen Publishing.  . (A SETH BOOK)

Short Stories and novellas:
"Prayer of a Wiser People" in Profile, 1950. 
"The Red Wagon" in Magazine of Fantasy and Science Fiction, December 1956 (republished 1993, Reality Change Magazine; anthologized in 1975, Ladies of Fantasy).
"The Canvas Pyramid" in Magazine of Fantasy and Science Fiction, March 1957 (French edition, 1958).
"First Communion" in Fantastic Universe, March 1957. 
"The Chestnut Beads" in Magazine of Fantasy and Science Fiction, October 1957 (French edition, 1958; anthologized in Triple W: Witches, Warlocks and Werewolves, 1963).
"The Bundu" (novella) in Magazine of Fantasy and Science Fiction, March 1958. 
"A Demon at Devotions" in Magazine of Fantasy and Science Fiction, September 1958 (reprinted in Reality Change Magazine, Winter 1994).
"Nightmare" in Magazine of Fantasy and Science Fiction, April 1959. 
"Impasse" in Magazine of Fantasy and Science Fiction, July 1959 (Spanish anthology edition ca. 1960).
"Three Times Around" in Magazine of Fantasy and Science Fiction, 1964 (anthologized in Earth Invaded, 1982). 
"The Big Freeze" in Dude, 1965 (reprinted in Reality Change Magazine, Summer 1994).
"The Mission," purchased by Topper magazine in August, 1965.  (Publication not yet confirmed.)

Poetry:
“Time” in The Saratogian [Saratoga Springs, NY], 1947 Mar 19.
“Enigma” in The Saratogian, 1947 Mar 19.
“Spring Gaiety” in The Saratogian, 1947 Apr 26.
“Rain” in Profile [Skidmore College literary magazine], December, 1947.
“Pretense” in Profile, December, 1947.
“Code” in Profile, December, 1947.
“Skyscrapers” in Profile, December, 1947.
“Introvert” in Profile, May, 1948.
“Poem” in Profile, May, 1948.
“How Public Like a Frog” in Profile, Fall, 1948.
“Motorcycle Ride” in Profile, Fall, 1948.
“Echo” in Profile, May, 1949.
“Death Stood at the Door” in Profile, May, 1949.
“Compromise” in Profile, May, 1949.
"I Shall Die in the Springtime." Patterns. v.1, n.1, October 1954.
"Lyric" Patterns. v.1, n.1, October 1954.
"Matilda" in Quicksilver, Spring, 1960.
"It is Springtime, Grandfather." Epos., v.12, n.3, Spring 1961.
"The Familiar." Bitterroot. v.1, n.2, Winter 1962.
"I Saw a Hand" in Treasures of Parnassus: Best Poems of 1962, Young Publications, 1962 (reprinted in The Elmira Star-Gazette, 1962).
"My Grandfather's World." Epos. v.14, n.3, Spring 1963.
"Lullaby." Epos. v.14, n.3, Spring 1963.
"Beware, October." Epos. v.16, n.1, Fall 1964.
"This Wrist, This Hand." Epos. v.16, n.4, Summer 1965.
"The Game." New Lantern Club Review. n.2, Summer 1965.
"The Flowers." Steppenwolf. n.1, Winter 1965-1966.
"Vision." Dust/9. v.3, n.1, Fall 1966.
"Who Whispers Yes." Dust/12. v.3, n.4, Spring 1969.
"Hi, Low, and Psycho."  Excerpts published in Reality Change, Third Quarter, 1996.

Roberts, Jane